Siosifa Lisala (born 2 February 1994 in Tonga) is a Tongan born Japanese rugby union player who plays for the NSW Waratahs in Super Rugby. His playing position is wing. He has signed to the Waratahs squad for the 2020 season.

Reference list

External links
itsrugby.co.uk profile

1994 births
Japanese rugby union players
Living people
Rugby union wings
New South Wales Waratahs players
Toyota Industries Shuttles Aichi players
NTT DoCoMo Red Hurricanes Osaka players
Rugby union centres
Urayasu D-Rocks players